The Sunbeam Spartan was a British 12-cylinder aero-engine designed and built in 1916.

Design and development
Louis Coatalen concentrated on water-cooled engines for the most part, but did design an air-cooled V-12 named Spartan. The single overhead camshaft operated two inlet and two exhaust valves per cylinder via rockers, and ignition was supplied by two 6-cyl. magnetos supplying spark to one spark plug per cylinder.

Specifications (Spartan)

See also

References

Bibliography
 
 Lumsden, Alec. British Piston Engines and their Aircraft. Marlborough, Wiltshire: Airlife Publishing, 2003. .

External links
 

Spartan
1910s aircraft piston engines